Scorpion pepper may refer to:

Trinidad moruga scorpion, the former hottest chili pepper cultivar. Aside from the heat, scorpion peppers have a very desirable fruity flavor. 
Trinidad Scorpion Butch T pepper, the former hottest chili pepper cultivar.